The fourth Tommy Murphy Cup Gaelic football competition began on June 30, 2007. The competition is in knockout format: the eight teams relegated to the National Football League 2007 Division 4 compete, plus Kilkenny. The competition was won by Wicklow in a final that was forced into extra-time against Antrim. The final score was 3-13 to 1-17.

Results

References

Tommy Murphy Cup
Tommy Murphy Cup